Jeffrey Dale Shantz (born October 10, 1973) is a Canadian former professional ice hockey centre. He played predominantly in the National Hockey League (NHL) with the Chicago Blackhawks, Calgary Flames and the Colorado Avalanche.

Playing career
Shantz was drafted by the Chicago Blackhawks in the second round, 36th overall in the 1992 NHL Entry Draft. On October 1, 2002, prior to the 2002–03 season, Shantz was traded by the Flames, along with Derek Morris and Dean McAmmond, to the Colorado Avalanche for Chris Drury and Stephane Yelle. He played 642 regular season games in the NHL with the Chicago Blackhawks, Calgary Flames and Colorado Avalanche scoring 72 goals and 139 assists for 211 points with 341 penalty minutes. He also played in 44 NHL playoff games, scoring 5 goals and 8 assists for 13 points with 24 penalty minutes.

After a single season with the Avalanche his NHL career finished in 2003, and he left for Europe playing two seasons for Langnau in the Swiss NLA and three seasons for Adler Mannheim of the DEL in Germany. Shantz then joined EBEL team EC KAC on a one-year contract for the 2008–09 season. In 53 games with Klagenfurt, Jeff finished fourth on the team with 17 goals and 48 points to help KAC win the Austrian Championship and as a result signed a one-year contract extension on April 23, 2009. Shantz and KAC parted at the conclusion of the 2011 season. After Shantz had formally announced retirement as a player it was expected that he would join the coaching ranks of KAC. The team however decided to not take Shantz up on his offer and he returned to Canada to pursue a career in the energy sector.

Personal
Shantz's maternal uncle is Joseph B. Martin, M.D., Ph.D., former Dean of Harvard Medical School.

Career statistics

Regular season and playoffs

International

Awards
 WHL East First All-Star Team – 1993

References

External links

1973 births
Living people
Adler Mannheim players
Calgary Flames players
Canadian expatriate ice hockey players in the United States
Canadian ice hockey centres
Chicago Blackhawks draft picks
Chicago Blackhawks players
Colorado Avalanche players
EC KAC players
EHC Biel players
HC Fribourg-Gottéron players
Ice hockey people from Alberta
Indianapolis Ice players
People from the County of Newell
Regina Pats players
Saint John Flames players
SCL Tigers players